Cyprinion semiplotum, the Assamese kingfish, is a species of cyprinid fish native to southern Asia where it occurs in fresh waters of India, Nepal, Bhutan and Myanmar.  This species can reach a length of  TL.  It is of minor importance to local commercial fisheries.

References

Cyprinion
Fish described in 1839